Britonia (which became Bretoña in Galician and Spanish) is the historical, apparently Latinized name of a Celtic settlement by Romano-Britons on the Iberian peninsula following the Anglo-Saxon settlement of Britain. The area is roughly analogous to the northern parts of the modern provinces of A Coruña and Lugo in the autonomous community of Galicia, Spain.

History 
Britonia was established in the Germanic Kingdom of the Suebi, in Gallaecia, northwestern Hispania, in the late 5th and early 6th centuries AD by Romano-Britons (possibly from the area of Cornwall). Britonia is therefore similar to Brittany in Gaul (present-day France), in that it was settled by expatriate Britons at roughly the same time. But unlike in Brittany, the Celts settling in the Iberian Britonia were eventually assimilated, completely losing their original language and culture.

The Britons may have occupied a pre-existing hill fort or castro. Gallaecia had earlier been inhabited by the Gallaeci peoples, before the arrival of the Germanic Suebi.

Modern place-names that reflect this history include the villages of Bretoña in the province of Lugo and Bretonia in the province of Pontevedra.

Ecclesiastical history 

What little is known of Britonia is deduced from its religious history - which is a very uncertain guide as to how long it retained a Celtic linguistic and cultural character. The British settlements were recognised at the First Council of Lugo in 569 and a separate bishopric established, on territory split off from the then Metropolitan Archdiocese of Lugo. Mailoc was nominated Bishop of Britonia and signed the acta at the Second Council of Braga in 572.

The establishment of the episcopal see of the Britons in Gallaecia was more probably not because of a migration, but only because a group of Christians, led by their bishop, must have taken refuge in a place near the coast of Lugo, where they would establish and organize a personal episcopal see, which later reached a territorial demarcation. For this reason the diocese was it mentions in the "Suevo Parish" as Ad sedem Britonorum ecclesiae quae sunt intro Britones una cum Monasterio Maximi et quae sunt in Asturiis. Established in Britonia, the capital of the diocese, regardless of its origin and provenance, its bishops appear in conciliar documents from the 6th century on. For example, Mailoc is among those who participated in the II Bracarense Council held in the year 572, and as its headquarters "was erected shortly before ... Mailoc signed last as least ancient". His successors attended other councils in Toledo and Braga : Errnerico participated in the III of Toledo signing, in 589, as bishop Laniobrense; Metopio attended the next one in 633; at VII, Sonna, who was already consecrated in 646 and who sent the priest Materico to the following council, in 653. In 675 Bishop Bela participated in the III Bracarense Council and then the title of Britonian appears for the last time, since Brandila and Suniagisido, who attended the XIII and XVI Councils of Toledo in the years 683 and 693, sign as Laniobrense bishops.(...)"

The British Celtic settlements were quickly integrated and their adherence to Celtic rite lasted only until the Fourth Council of Toledo in 633 decreed the now so-called Visigothic or Mozarabic rite as the standard liturgy of Hispania.

The diocese was suppressed in 716.  The line of (errant?) bishops of Britonia nevertheless existed at least until 830, when the area was attacked by the Vikings; it may have continued as late as the Council of Oviedo in 900.

It was finally restored as or merged into the Diocese of Mondoñedo-Ferrol in 866, being assigned territories split off from the Diocese of Oviedo and from the Metropolitan Archdiocese of Lugo (since 1071 a suffragan of Santiago de Compostela).

Resident Bishops of Bretoña 
Known bishops of the ecclesia Brittaniensis include:
 Mailoc (Second Council of Braga, 572 – death ?)
 Metopius (Fourth Council of Toledo, 633)
 Sonna (Seventh Council of Toledo, 646 – 653?)
 Susa (Eighth Council of Toledo, 653 – ?675)
 Bela (Third Council of Braga, 675–?)

"Bishop Mailoc is the only Britonian prelate who has a Celtic name (= "great"). The other known bishops always bear Latin or Germanic names.(...)".

Titular see 
No longer a residential bishopric, Britonia is today listed by the Catholic Church as a titular see.

The diocese was nominally restored in 1969 as Latin Titular bishopric of Britonia (also Curiate Italian) / Britonien(sis) (Latin adjective).

It has had the following incumbents, so far secular priests of the fitting Episcopal (lowest) rank:
 Eugene O’Callaghan (28 November 1969 – resigned 26 January 1971), on emeritate as former Bishop of Clogher (Ireland) (30 January 1943 – 28 November 1969), died 1973
 John Brewer (31 May 1971 – 22 May 1985), first as Auxiliary Bishop of Diocese of Shrewsbury (England, UK) (31 May 1971 – 17 November 1983), then as Coadjutor Bishop of Lancaster (England) (17 November 1983 – 22 May 1985); later succeeded as Bishop of Lancaster (22 May 1985 – death 10 June 2000)
 Edward Joseph O’Donnell (6 December 1983 – 8 November 1994) as Auxiliary Bishop of Archdiocese of Saint Louis (USA) (6 December 1983 – 8 November 1994); later Bishop of Lafayette in Louisiana (USA) (8 November 1994 – retired 8 November 2002); died 2009
 Paweł Cieślik (3 December 1994 – now), as former Auxiliary Bishop of Diocese of Koszalin–Kołobrzeg (Poland) (3 December 1994 – 19 September 2012) and as emeritate (3 December 1994 – now)

See also
 Celtic nations

References 

 Richards, Melville, "Mailoc", Habis, III, 1972, p. 159.
 Tovar, António, "Un obispo con nombre británico y los orígenes de la diócesis de Mondoñedo", Habis, III, 1972, pp. 155–158.
 Vives, J., Concilios visigóticos e hispano-romanos, Madrid, 1963.
 
 Young, Simon, "The Forgotten Colony", History Today, L, Oct. 2000, pp. 5–6.
 Young, Simon, Britonia: Camiños Novos, Noia, 2002. . (in Galician)

External links 
  Site by Simon Young dedicated to Britonia research 
 GCatholic - titular see of Britonia, with Google satellite photo
 GCatholic - Diocese of Mondoñedo–Ferrol, successor see of Britonia, with Google mape and - satellite photo
 catholic-hierarchy.org - Present Latin Catholic titular see of Britonia

6th century in Hispania
History of the British Isles
British diaspora in Europe
Kingdom of the Suebi
5th-century establishments
Sub-Roman Britain
History of Galicia (Spain)
Celtic Britons